This is a list of social service agencies (SSA) in Singapore. 

These agencies are members of the National Council of Social Service (NCSS) in Singapore.

Legend 
 Syntax: [[Official NCSS registered name]], date of registration

A-G 
365 Cancer Prevention Society
 Action for AIDS
 Adventist Community Services
 Adventist Home for the Elders
 Adventist Nursing & Rehabilitation Centre
 Agape Counselling and Training Centre
 Ain Society
 Alexandra Hospital, Medical Social Service
 aLife Ltd
 All Saints Home
 Alzheimer's Disease Association
 American Women's Association
 Ang Mo Kio - Thye Hua Kwan Hospital
 Ang Mo Kio Family Service Centres
 Animal Concerns Research and Education Society, 24.5.2001
 Animal Lovers League, 25.3.2002
 Apex Clubs of Singapore
 Apex Day Rehabilitation Centre for Elderly
 Apex Harmony Lodge
 APSN Centre for Adults
 Archdiocese Commission for the Pastoral Care of Migrants & Itinerant People
 Ark Quest
 Asian Women's Welfare Association
 As-Salaam Family Support Centre
 Assemblies of God Community Services Society
 Assisi Hospice
 Association for Early Childhood Educators
 Association for Person with Special Needs
 Association for Psychiatric Rehabilitation
 Association of Apex Clubs of Singapore
 Association of Muslim Professionals
 Association of Women for Action and Research
 Australian & New Zealand Association
 Autism Association
 Autism Resource Centre
 Avelife Foundation
 Balestier Special School
 Baptist Student Care Centre
 Bartley Community Care Services
 Bethesda Care & Counselling Services Centre
 Bethesda Community Assistance and Relationship Enrichment Centre
 Bethesda Community Services Society
 Beyond Social Services
 Bible-Presbyterian Welfare Services
 Bishan Toa Payoh CCC North Child Care & Delpmt Ctr
 Bizlink Centre Singapore
 Blue Cross Charitable Institution
 Bo Tien Home for the Aged
 Bo Tien Welfare Services Society
 Bone Marrow Donor Programme http://bmdp.org/
 Boon Lay Neighbourhood Link
 Boys' Brigade in Singapore
 Boys' Town Singapore
 Breadline Group
 Breakthrough Missions
 Breaking Margins
 Breastfeeding Mothers' Support Group
 Bright Hill Evergreen Home
 Bright Vision Hospital
 Buddha of Medicine Welfare Society
 Buddhist Compassion Relief Tzu Chi Foundation
 Buddhist Culture Centre
 Buddhist Union
 Bukit Ho Swee FSC
 Canossian Daughters of Charity
 Care Community Services Society
 Care Corner Child Development Centre
 Care Corner Child Development Centre
 Care Corner Counselling Centre
 Care Corner Family Service Centre
 Care Corner SAC
 Care Corner SAC
 Care Corner Singapore
 Care for the Elderly Foundation
 Care Link
 CareCancer Society
 Caregiving Welfare Association
 Catholic Welfare Services Singapore
 Central Council of Malay Cultural Organisation (Majlis Pusat)
 Central Singapore CDC (SS BoonHua)
 Centre for Exceptional Children
 Centre for Fathering
 Centre for Promoting Alternatives to Violence
 Centre of Activity & Recreation for the Elders
 Cerebral Palsy Alliance Singapore, formerly known as Spastic Children's Association of Singapore
 Charis Centre
 Chen Su Lan Methodist Children's Home
 Chen Su Lan Trust
 Cheng Hong Welfare Service Society
 Cheshire Homes Far Eastern Regional Council
 Children-At-Risk Empowerment Association (CARE Singapore)
 Children's Aid Society
 Children's Cancer Foundation
 Children's Charities Association of Singapore
 Chinese Development Assistance Council
 Chinese Women's Association
 Chong Hua Tong SAC
 Christian Care Services
 Christian Outreach to the Handicapped
 City Harvest Community Services Association
 Club Rainbow (Singapore)
 Coalition Against Bullying for Children & Youth
 Compass Welfare Foundation
 Concern & Care Society
 Cornerstone Community Services Centre
 Cornerstone Life Skills Centre
 Counselling & Care Centre
 Covenant Family Service Centre
 Credit Counselling Singapore Society
 Crime Library
 Daybreak Family Service Centre
 Diabetic Society of Singapore
 Disability Information and Referral Centre
 Disabled People's Association
 Dover Park Hospice
 Down Syndrome Association
 Dreams @ Kolam Ayer
 Dyslexia Association of Singapore
 Eagles Mediation & Counselling Centre
 Eden Community Services Centre
 EN Community Services Society
 Endometriosis Association
 Epworth Community Services
 Eurasian Association Singapore
 Ex-Services Association of Singapore
 Family Life Centre
 Family Life Society
 Federation of Youth Clubs
 Fei Yue Community Services
 Fei Yue Family Service Centre
 Filos Community Services
 Focus on the Family Singapore
 Food from the Heart
 Foundation of Rotary Clubs
 Franciscan Missionaries of Mary
 Friends in Deed Counselling Society
 Gabrielite Centre for School Counselling
 Gerontological Society
 Geylang East Home for the Aged
 Geylang Senior Citizens' Health Care Centre
 Girl Guides Singapore
 Girls' Brigade Singapore
 Glory Centre Community Services Association
 Golden Years Fellowship
 Good News Community Services Centre
 Grace Lodge

H-P
 Habitat for Humanity Singapore
 Haemophilia Society of Singapore
 Handicaps Welfare Association
 Happy Arts Enterprise
 Hariprasad Children Centre
 Hariprasad
 Healthy Aging Association
 Hearty Care Centre
 HELP Family Service Centre
 The Helping Hand (halfway house)
 Hiding Place (Christian Home Mission)
 Highpoint Community Services Association
 Home Nursing Foundation
 Hope Centre
 HOPE Worldwide
 Hospice Care Association
 Hougang Sheng Hong Family Service Centre
 Hua Mei Care Management Service of Tsao Foundation
 Hua Mei Seniors Clinic
 Humanitarian Organization for Migration Economics
 iC2 PrepHouse Limited
 Indus Moral CARE
 Infant Jesus Homes and Children's Centres
 Inner Wheel Club of Singapore
 International Y'S Men's Club of Singapore
 International Nature Loving Association (Singapore), 14.9.2009
 iPaLs
 Islamic Theological Association of Singapore (Pertapis)
 Istavin Dynamics
 Jenaris Home@Pelangi Village
 Jewish Welfare Board
 Jia Ying Community Services Society
 Joy Centre
 Joy Place - Centre for Children w/Special Needs
 Ju Eng Welfare Association
 Junior Chamber of Singapore
 Kallang Bahru Family Service Centre
 Kamala Club
 Kampong Kapor Family Service Centre
 Kampung Senang Charity and Education Foundation, 11.2.1999
 Kang Ming Free Clinic
 Kheng Chiu Loke Tin Kee Home
 Kidney Dialysis Foundation
 King George's Ave SAC
 Kiwanis Club of Singapore
 Kreta Ayer SAC
 Kwan-In Welfare Society
 Kwong Wai Shiu Hospital and Nursing Home
 Lakeside Family Centre
 Leukemia and Lymphoma Foundation
 Life Community Services Society
 Life Spring Community Network
 Light & Love Welfare Services Centre
 Ling Kwang Home for Senior Citizens
 Lioness Club of Singapore
 Lions Befriender Service Association
 Lions Club of Singapore
 Lions Community Service Foundation
 Lions Home for the Elders
 Lotus Light Charity Society (Singapore)
 Loving Heart Multi-Service Centre
 Lutheran Community Care Services
 Macpherson Moral Family Service Centre
 Mainly I Love Kids Fund (MILK)
 Majulah Community 
 Make-A-Wish Foundation
 Malay Youth Literary Association (4PM)
 Malay Youth Literary Association (Persatuan Persuratan Pemuda Pemudi Melayu)
 Man Fatt Lam Home for the Aged
 Man Fut Tong Nursing Home
 Man Fut Tong Nursing
 Marian Centre
 Marine Parade Family Service Centre
 Marymount Centre
 [[MCYC Community Services Society rebranded to Epworth Community Services]]
 Methodist Hospice Fellowship
 Methodist Welfare Services
 Metropolitan YMCA
 Metta Welfare Association
 Ministry of Community Development & Sports (Social Support Division)
 Moral Family Service Centre
 Moral Home for Disabled Adults
 Moral Neighbourhood Link
 Moral SAC (Toa Payoh)
 Morning Star Community Services
 Movement for the Intellectually Disabled of Singapore
 Muhammadiyah Welfare Home
 Muscular Dystrophy Association of Singapore
 Muslim Kidney Action Association (MKAC)
 Muslim Missionary Society Singapore (Jamiyah)
 Muslim Social Welfare Association of Sembawang
 Muslimin Trust Fund Association (Darul Ihsan)
 Nanyang Technological University Welfare Services club
 National Arthritis Foundation
 National Cancer Centre (Psychosocial Oncology)
 National Kidney Foundation
 National Safety Council of Singapore
 National St John Council
 National University of Singapore Students' Union
 Neighbour Ring Community Services
 Netherlands Charity Association
 New Hope Community Services
 New Horizon Centre (Loke Yew - Tampines)
 New Horizon Centre (Toa Payoh)
 New Life Community Services Centre
 NTUC Child Care Co-operative (Kim Keat)
 NTUC Child Care Co-operative (Toa Payoh)
 NTUC Eldercare Co-Operative
 Nulife Care & Counselling Services
 O'Joy Care Services
 Oxley Student Care Centre
 Parkinson's Disease Society
 Parkway HealthCare Foundation
 Pasir Panjang Hill Community Services Centre
 Passiton Admin
 Passiton Mobility
 Peace-Connect
 Pertapis Children's Home
 Pertapis Halfway House
 Philippine Bayanihan Society Singapore
 PPIS-Jurong Family Service Centre
 Presbyterian Community Services
 Prison Fellowship Singapore
 Project:Senso Ltd
 Promised Land Missions
 Promisedland Community Services
 Prophet Muhammad's Birthday Memorial Scholarship Fund Board
 Pu Ti Lian She

Q-S 
 Queenstown Multi-Service Centre for the Elderly
 Rainbow Centre
 Ramakrishna Mission
 REACH Community Services Society
 Reach Family Service Centre
 Realm of Tranquility
 Red Swastika Charity Foundation
 Ren Ci Hospital and Medicare Centre
 Renewal Self-Development Centre
 Retired & Senior Volunteer Programme
 Riding for the Disabled Association of Singapore
 RiverLife Community Service Centre
 Rochore Kongsi for the Aged
 Rotary Club of Singapore
 Salem Welfare Services
 Salvation Army
 Samaritans of Singapore
 Sanctuary House Limited
 Sathya Sai Social Service
 Save the Children
 Sembawang Tamils' Association
 Serangoon Moral Family Service Centre
 SGRainbow
 Shan You Counselling Centre
 Sian Chay Medical Institution
 Sikh Sewaks Singapore
 Sikh Welfare Council
 Sinda Family Service Centre
 Singapore Action Group of Elders
 Singapore After-Care Association
 Singapore Airport Terminal Services Staff Association
 Singapore Amalgamated Services Co-Operative Organisation Senior Citizens Home
 Singapore American Community Action Council
 Singapore Anglican Community Services
 Singapore Anti-Narcotics Association
 Singapore Anti-Tuberculosis Association
 Singapore Association for Counselling
 Singapore Association for Mental Health
 Singapore Association for the Deaf
 Singapore Association for the Study of Obesity
 Singapore Association of Occupational Therapists
 Singapore Association of Social Workers
 Singapore Association of the Institute of Chartered Secretaries & Administrators
 Singapore Association of the Visually Handicapped
 Singapore Baptist Convention Golden Age Home
 Singapore Branch of the Missions to Seafarers
 Singapore Buddhist Federation
 Singapore Buddhist Free Clinic
 Singapore Buddhist Lodge
 Singapore Buddhist Lodge Vision Family Services
 Singapore Buddhist Lodge Welfare Foundation
 Singapore Buddhist Welfare Services
 Singapore Cancer Society
 Singapore Cheshire Home
 Singapore Children's Society
 Singapore Christian Home for the Aged
 Singapore Chung Hwa Medical Institution
 Singapore Committee of the World Organisation for Early Children Education
 Singapore Corporation of Rehabilitative Enterprises
 Singapore Council of Women's Organisations
 Singapore Dental Health Foundation
 Singapore Disability Sports Council
 Singapore General Hospital, Medical Social Service
 Singapore Gujarati Society
 Singapore Heart Foundation
 Singapore Hospice Council
 Singapore Heritage Society
 Singapore Indian Development Association
 Singapore Indian Education Trust
 Singapore International Chamber of Commerce
 Singapore International Foundation
 Singapore Kadayanallur Muslim League
 Singapore Leprosy Relief Association
 Singapore Life Saving Society
 Singapore Malay Youth Library Association (Taman Bacaan)
 Singapore National Stroke Association
 Singapore Nurses' Association
 Singapore Physiotherapy Association
 Singapore Planned Parenthood Association
 Singapore Polytechnic Welfare Services
 Singapore Professional Centre
 Singapore Psychological Society
 Singapore Red Cross Society
 Singapore Regional Centre of the World Fellowship of Buddhists
 Singapore Scout Association
 Singapore Society for the Prevention of Cruelty to Animals
 Singapore Tenkasi Muslim Welfare Society
 Singapore Thong Chai Medical Institution
 Singapore Women's Association
 Singhealth Polyclinics
 Society Against Family Violence
 Society for Continence
 Society for the Aged Sick
 Society for the Physically Disabled
 Society for the Prevention of Cruelty to Animals
 Society for the Promotion of ADHD Research and Knowledge
 Society of Moral Charities
 Society of Sheng Hong Welfare Services
 Society of Saint Vincent de Paul
 Soroptimist International of Singapore
 South Central Community Family Service Centre, formerly Bukit Ho Swee Family Service Centre
 Special Needs Trust Company
 Special Olympics Singapore
 Speech-Language and Hearing Association
 Sree Narayana Mission
 Sri Krishna Mandir Welfare Society
 St Andrew's Cathedral Home for the Aged
 St Andrew's Mission Hospital
 St Gabriel's Foundation
 St Hilda's Community Services Centre
 St John's Ambulance Brigade
 St John's Home for Elderly Persons
 St Luke's Elder Care
 St Luke's Hospital
 St. Hilda's Community Services Centre
 Student Advisory Centre
 Student Volunteer Corps
 Students Care Service (SCS)
 SUN-DAC 
 Sunlove Abode for Intellectually-Infirmed
 Sunshine Welfare Action Mission

T-Z
 Tai Pei Old People's Home
 Tampines Family Service Centre
 Tanjong Pagar Family Service Centre
 Teen Challenge
 Temasek Polytechnic Community Service Club
 The Tent (organisation)
 The Red Pencil (Singapore)
 Thong Kheng Seniors Activity Centre (Radin Mas)
 Thong Kheng Welfare Services Society
 Thye Hua Kwan Moral Society
 Toa Payoh East Student Care
 Toa Payoh Senior Citizens' Health Care Centre
 TOUCH Community Services
 Touch Home Care
 Touch Seniors Activity Centre
 TRANS Centre
 Tsao Foundation
 Turning Point
 Trybe
 Tzu Chi Singapore
 United Indian Muslim Association
 Vegetarian Society (Singapore), 16.6.1999 
 Very Special Arts Singapore
 Viriya Community Services
 Volunteer Guitar Connection
 We-sharecare Society for Children & Youth
 Wesley Counselling Services
 Whampoa Eldercare Centre
 Whispering Hearts Family Service Centre
 Wicare Support Group
 Women's & Children's Healthcare Foundation
 Women's Initiative For Ageing Successfully
 Woolands Social Centre
 World Red Swastika Society
 World Vision
 World Vision Singapore
 Xin Yuan Community Care
 Yayasan Mendaki
 Yong-En Care Centre
 YMCA of Singapore
 Young Women Muslim Association of Singapore
 Young Women's Christian Association of Singapore
 Youth Challenge
 Youth Guidance Outreach Services
 YWCA Adult Care Centre
 YWCA Child Development Centre (Bishan)
 Zhi Zhen Tan Dao Xue Hui (Singapore)
 Zion Home for the Aged
 Zonta Club of Singapore

See also
 List of disability organisations in Singapore
 List of youth organisations in Singapore

References

 
Voluntary welfare organisation, Singapore